Nasir Khan (born 31 May 1975) is a Pakistani first-class cricketer who played for Karachi cricket team and Defence Housing Authority cricket team.

References

External links
 

1975 births
Living people
Pakistani cricketers
Defence Housing Authority cricketers
Karachi cricketers
Cricketers from Karachi